Emmalocera lateritiella is a species of snout moth in the genus Emmalocera. It was described by George Hampson in 1918. It is found in Nigeria.

References

Moths described in 1918
Emmalocera